Universitatea Craiova is a professional association football club based in Craiova, Romania. The club was founded in 1948 by a group of professors and students from the University of Craiova. The team was promoted for the first to the top league of Romanian football in the 1964–65 season.

CS Universitatea Craiova played their first top league fixture on 30 August 1964 against Steaua București. Since that game they have played in 1010 first league matches and have faced 48 different sides. Their most regular opponents have been Dinamo București, whom they have played against on 64 occasions. The club has won 29 of the league matches against Argeș Pitești which represents the most Craiova have won against any team. They have drawn more matches with Dinamo București than with any other club, with 18 of their meetings finishing without a winner. Steaua București are the side that has defeated Craiova in more league games than any other club, having won 34 of their encounters.

Key
 The table includes results of matches played by Universitatea Craiova in Liga I.
   Teams with this background and symbol in the "Club" column are competing in the 2017–18 Liga I alongside Universitatea Craiova.
   Clubs with this background and symbol in the "Club" column are defunct
 The name used for each opponent is the name they had when Universitatea Craiova most recently played a league match against them. Results against each opponent include results against that club under any former name. For example, results against Universitatea Cluj include matches played against Știința Cluj.
 P = matches played; W = matches won; D = matches drawn; L = matches lost; F = goals for; A = goals against; Win% = percentage of total matches won
 The columns headed "First" and "Last" contain the first and most recent seasons in which Universitatea Craiova played league matches against each opponent

All-time league record
Statistics correct as of matches played on season 2016–17.

References

General
 
 

CS Universitatea Craiova
Romanian football club league records by opponent